Meera Jaakirathai is the 2016 Tamil-language horror film directed by R. G. Kesvaan. The film stars an ensemble cast featuring Surendar and Monica amongst others. Music for the film was composed by the Raj and the film opened to mixed reviews in May 2016, having been in production for six years.

Cast
Surendar
 Monica
 Bobby Simha as Sivanesan
 Swaminathan
 Sri Priya
 Santhosh
 Joy 
 Sanjay
 Ramalingam

Production
In 2010, producer Kesavan decided to finance a film directed by Sathish, a contestant from the reality show Naalaiya Iyakkunar. Sathish subsequently selected his friend, Bobby Simha, then a small-time actor, to portray a negative role in the film. The shoot for the film was primarily completed in a week-long schedule at Tiruchengode. During the making of the film, Sathish and Bobby often disagreed with Kesavan and after an alcohol-fuelled incident, Kesavan reported Sathish to the police, following which the director left the project.

In May 2016, the production team suddenly started promoting the film through posters in newspapers, after having completed the film with extra scenes, involving actress Monica. After finding the promotional material, Bobby Simha complained to the Nadigar Sangam , claiming that he didn't recall starring in such a film and that the producers had used pictures from his previous film, Urumeen (2015). He had previously made similar claims against the makers of another film, Chennai Ungalai Anbudan Varaverkirathu (2015).

Release
The film opened in May 2016 to negative reviews from critics and had a low profile release across Tamil Nadu. A critic from the New Indian Express stated what it is "appreciable is the effort the first-time director has put in", labelling it was a "horror-thriller crafted in the conventional way".

References

2016 films
2010s Tamil-language films
2016 horror films
Indian horror films
2016 directorial debut films